"Jennifer Juniper" is a song and single by the Scottish singer-songwriter Donovan, released in 1968. It peaked at number 5 in the UK Singles Chart, and at number 26 in the Billboard Hot 100. AllMusic journalist Matthew Greenwald noted that "capturing all of the innocence of the era perfectly, it's one of his finest singles".

Song 
The track was written about Jenny Boyd, sister of Pattie Boyd, shortly before they went with The Beatles to Rishikesh. She married Mick Fleetwood and was, at one time, the sister-in-law of George Harrison and, later, Eric Clapton.

The song features a wind section with oboe, flute, French horn, and bassoon.  The last stanza of the song is sung in French.

Cash Box called it a "gentle voiced ballad" with "glittering arrangement with hushed drumming, soft flute trills and a delightful small combo orchestration" and "pretty lyrics of innocence and naturalist imagery," and also praised the "exquisite artistry."

Donovan also performed on a novelty cover of the single released in Britain in 1990, by comedy duo Trevor and Simon, as "The Singing Corner Meets Donovan". It spent one week at number 68 in the UK Singles Chart in December 1990.

B-side 
The B-side "Poor Cow" is a song produced for the film Poor Cow by Ken Loach. The original title of the song was "Poor Love". The title was changed when the song appeared in the film.  It retained that title when released as the B-side to "Jennifer Juniper" in February 1968.  "Poor Cow" is introduced by Donovan as "Poor Love" on his live album Donovan in Concert (1968).

Cash Box called "Poor Cow" a "folk theme with jazz touch from the current movie scor.."

In popular culture 
The song features in The Simpsons episode "Flaming Moe", along with a character called Calliope Juniper.

Theodore Bikel covered the song on his album A New Day (1970).

Natalie Portman's character plays this song on the piano in Mr. Magorium's Wonder Emporium.

The song was featured in the 1999 film Election.

17. 12. In 1968, Czech singer Václav Neckář recorded a cover version of this song with Czech lyrics by Zdeněk Rytíř. The song is called "Čaroděj Dobroděj".

References

External links
 Jennifer Juniper (Single) – Donovan Unofficial Site

Donovan songs
1968 singles
Song recordings produced by Mickie Most
Songs written by Donovan
1967 songs
Pye Records singles